Plainview High School is a public high school located in the city of Plainview, Texas, USA and classified as a 5A school by the UIL.  It is a part of the Plainview Independent School District located in northeast Hale County.   In 2015, the school was rated "Met Standard" by the Texas Education Agency.

Athletics
The Plainview Bulldogs compete in these sports -

Volleyball, Cross Country, Football, Basketball, Powerlifting, Golf, Tennis, Track, Baseball & Softball

State Titles
Plainview (UIL)
Boys Basketball - 
1994(4A) 
Girls Basketball - 
1987(5A), 2001(4A), 2002(4A), 2003(4A)

State Finalist
Plainview (UIL)
Girls Basketball - 
2004(4A)

Plainview Washington (PVIL)
Boys Basketball - 
1954(PVIL-B)

Theater
One Act Play - 
1928(All)

Student performance
 Hispanic and Latino students were the majority of the high school dropouts in Plainview; students of that ethnicity in the Class of 2008 of Plainview High had a 2.5 time higher likelihood of dropping out compared to Anglo White students in the same class. That year the four-year high school dropout rate of Plainview High was almost two times larger than the average in Texas. The head of the alternative high school Houston School,  Tommy Chatham, stated in 2008 that there were multiple jobs in Plainview that did not require a high school diploma.

Notable alumni

Bob Bryant, American Football League player
Michael Egnew, National Football League player
Leonard Garcia, MMA artist
Lawrence McCutcheon, running back for the Los Angeles Rams from 1972–1979, the Denver Broncos & Seattle Seahawks in 1980 and the Buffalo Bills in 1981.
Lavern Roach, (1925-1950) boxer, who was Ring Magazine's Rookie-of-the-Year in 1947. He died following a fatal blow received in a match on his 25th birthday.
Jerry Sisemore, National Football League player
Jamar Wall, National Football League and Canadian Football League player

References

External links
Plainview ISD website

Public high schools in Texas
Schools in Hale County, Texas